Pride Shockwave 2006 was a mixed martial arts event held by Pride Fighting Championships on December 31, 2006.

Background
The main event was scheduled to be heavyweight Champion Fedor Emelianenko defending his heavyweight championship against the winner of the Absolute Grand Prix, but Mirko Filipović was recovering from foot surgery he underwent on October 26 and could not fight at Shockwave.

Josh Barnett, the Absolute Grand Prix runner up, was also a contender to face Emelianenko, as mentioned by the heavyweight champion in a Pride 32 post-fight press conference, but was "not in the best condition" to compete and instead fought Antônio Rodrigo Nogueira in a rematch and lost that fight to. Ultimately, Fedor defended his title against Mark Hunt.

The event was the first outside of tournaments, title bouts, and fights under the NSAC jurisdiction to feature concrete weight classes. All Lightweight (-73 kg) and Welterweight (-83 kg) bouts were fought under Bushido rules with one ten-minute and one five-minute round. The sole exception however was the fight between Minowa and Tamura, as both had requested to fight under full Pride rules as well as fight in the opening fight of the night.

Results

See also
 Pride Fighting Championships
 List of Pride Fighting Championships champions
 List of Pride FC events
 2006 in Pride FC

References

Shockwave 2006
2006 in mixed martial arts
Mixed martial arts in Japan
Sport in Saitama (city)